The 2006 United States House of Representatives elections in West Virginia were held on November 7, 2006, to determine who will represent the state of West Virginia in the United States House of Representatives. West Virginia has three seats in the House, apportioned according to the 2000 United States Census. Representatives are elected for two-year terms.

Overview

District 1 

Incumbent Democrat Alan Mollohan defeated Republican Chris Wakim, a state delegate. This district covers the northern part of the state.

District 2 

Incumbent Republican Shelley Moore Capito defeated Democrat Mike Callaghan, a U.S. Attorney. This district covers the central part of the state.

District 3 

Incumbent Democrat Nick Rahall defeated Republican Kim Wolfe, the Sheriff of Cabell County. This district covers the southern part of the state.

References 

2006 West Virginia elections
West Virginia
2006